The Object Management Group (OMG) is a computer industry standards consortium. OMG Task Forces develop enterprise integration standards for a range of technologies.

Business activities 
The goal of the OMG was a common portable and interoperable object model with methods and data that work using all types of development environments on all types of platforms.

The group provides only specifications, not implementations. But before a specification can be accepted as a standard by the group, the members of the submitter team must guarantee that they will bring a conforming product to market within a year. This is an attempt to prevent unimplemented (and unimplementable) standards. Other private companies or open source groups are encouraged to produce conforming products and OMG is attempting to develop mechanisms to enforce true interoperability.

OMG hosts four technical meetings per year for its members and interested nonmembers. The Technical Meetings provide a neutral forum to discuss, develop and adopt standards that enable software interoperability.

History 
Founded in 1989 by eleven companies (including Hewlett-Packard, IBM, Sun Microsystems, Apple Computer, American Airlines, iGrafx, and Data General), OMG's initial focus was to create a heterogeneous distributed object standard.  The founding executive team included Christopher Stone and John Slitz. Current leadership includes chairman and CEO Richard Soley, President and COO Bill Hoffman and Vice President and Technical Director Jason McC. Smith.

Since 2000, the group's international headquarters has been located in Boston, Massachusetts.

In 1997, the Unified Modeling Language (UML) was added to the list of OMG adopted technologies. UML is a standardized general-purpose modeling language in the field of object-oriented software engineering.

In June 2005, the Business Process Management Initiative (BPMI.org) and OMG announced the merger of their respective Business Process Management (BPM) activities to form the Business Modeling and Integration Domain Task Force (BMI DTF).

In 2006 the Business Process Model and Notation (BPMN) was adopted as a standard by OMG. In 2007 the Business Motivation Model (BMM) was adopted as a standard by the OMG. The BMM is a metamodel that provides a vocabulary for corporate governance and strategic planning and is particularly relevant to businesses undertaking governance, regulatory compliance, business transformation and strategic planning activities.

In 2009 OMG, together with the Software Engineering Institute at Carnegie Mellon launched the Consortium of IT Software Quality (CISQ).

In 2011 OMG formed the Cloud Standards Customer Council. Founding sponsors included CA, IBM, Kaavo, Rackspace and Software AG. The CSCC is an OMG end user advocacy group dedicated to accelerating cloud's successful adoption, and drilling down into the standards, security and interoperability issues surrounding the transition to the cloud.

In September 2011, the OMG Board of Directors voted to adopt the Vector Signal and Image Processing Library (VSIPL) as the latest OMG specification. Work for adopting the specification was led by Mentor Graphics' Embedded Software Division, RunTime Computing Solutions, The Mitre Corporation as well as the High Performance Embedded Computing Software Initiative (HPEC-SI). VSIPL is an application programming interface (API). VSIPL and VSIPL++ contain functions used for common signal processing kernel and other computations. These functions include basic arithmetic, trigonometric, transcendental, signal processing, linear algebra, and image processing. The VSIPL family of libraries has been implemented by multiple vendors for a range of processor architectures, including x86, PowerPC, Cell, and NVIDIA GPUs. VSIPL and VSIPL++ are designed to maintain portability across a range of processor architectures. Additionally, VSIPL++ was designed from the start to include support for parallelism.

Late 2012 early 2013, the group's Board of Directors adopted the Automated Function Point (AFP) specification. The push for adoption was led by the Consortium for IT Software Quality (CISQ). AFP provides a standard for automating the popular function point measure according to the counting guidelines of the International Function Point User Group (IFPUG).

On March 27, 2014, OMG announced it would be managing the newly formed Industrial Internet Consortium (IIC).

Ratified ISO Standards 
Of the many standards maintained by the OMG, 13 have been ratified as ISO standards. These standards are:

See also 
DIIOP
ReqIF

References

External links
 

Standards organizations in the United States
Unified Modeling Language